Innis College is one of the constituent colleges of the University of Toronto. It is one of the University of Toronto's smallest colleges in terms of size and the second smallest college in terms of population with approximately 2000 registered students. It is located in the campus' historic west end, directly north of Robarts Library, and is named after prominent University of Toronto political economist Harold Innis.

The College includes a fully equipped cinema, supporting 35mm, 16mm, and all digital presentation formats, known as Innis Town Hall, which hosts numerous film festivals, free film screenings, and a variety of other cultural events. It also serves as a venue for Hot Docs, which is North America's largest documentary film festival.

History

Originally designed to be a wing (now Wetmore Hall) onto New College, Innis College was founded separately in 1964 as the second non-federated college to be formed under the University's administration.

Although initially located at the Macdonald-Mowatt house on St. George Street, the College has since relocated to a building on Sussex Avenue that incorporates a substantial Victorian home into a functional modern structure designed by Jack Diamond and Barton Myers.

Vladimir House, the first Innis residence located at 651 Spadina Avenue, was replaced by a larger, modern residence in 1994.

Innis was also the first University of Toronto college to host an open pub (1975) and the first one to sport an equity split between faculty and students on its governing council.

The current Principal of Innis College is Charlie Keil. The current Innis Registrar is Donald Boere.

Governance and Services

As mentioned, Innis College was the first college at the University of Toronto to have parity between students and faculty on its governing council. The main governing body of Innis College is the Innis College Council and operates under the Governing Council of the University of Toronto. The College Council is made up of students, administration, and other interest groups including the members of the later life learning program, and the alumni association to name a few. The council has many boards including boards on academic affairs, college affairs, student affairs, and community affairs. It is the job of the council to exercise the college's autonomous rights granted to them by the University and therefore oversees admissions, awards, and academic programs offered by the college.

The students of Innis College as well as the engineers living in the Innis Residence are members of the Innis College Student Society (ICSS). The ICSS is represented by a governing body that offers student services, as well as social events held by the college. The governing body of the ICSS is made up of an executive body, student representatives, and operations directors, all of whom are students.

Innis College is home to the Cinema Studies Student Union (CINSSU) and the Urban Studies Student Union (URSSU); the representative unions of students enrolled in Cinema Studies and Urban Studies programs.

Innis College is watched over by an administrative staff consisting of the Principal's Office and Registrar's Office, as well as the Innis Town Hall and Innis College Library staff.

Innis College houses a student-run newspaper called The Innis Herald which releases quarterly issues to the University of Toronto community. Their website has more current issues and there is a digital archive of The Innis Herald past issues (starting in 1965/1966).

Academic programs

All students of the College are enrolled in the Faculty of Arts and Science. Innis College also hosts several programs in the faculty, which are:
 Cinema Studies (Innis is home to the Cinema Studies Institute, which not only offers the undergraduate program, but also graduate programs: a one-year MA program and PhD program)
 Urban Studies
 Writing and Rhetoric (Minor)
 First Year Foundations (FYF) courses: Innis One Program and FYF@Innis Seminars

Innis College students are welcome to enrol in any program within the Faculty of Arts & Science, and any student in the Faculty may enrol in one (or more) of Innis' programs.

The College formerly hosted the Environmental Studies program before it was relocated to the University's Centre for Environment.

Students

A student studying at Innis College is a member of the University of Toronto, the Faculty of Arts and Science, and Innis College. The representative body of Innis Students is the Innis College Student Society (ICSS). The student society is a mandatory membership student group which receives its funding through a dedicated student levy collected by the University of Toronto. Both Innis Students and engineering students living in the Innis Residence have this levy collected from them and are therefore members of the ICSS.

The ICSS holds elections twice a year; once in March at the end of the school year to elect the following year's council and once in September at the beginning of the school year to fill vacancies and elect first year student representatives. The ICSS conducts its elections using a preferential voting electoral method.

The ICSS Governing Body meets every two weeks during the academic year in open meetings where members of council, as well as members of the society are invited to deliberate on various issues. The deliberative proceedings of the ICSS government are conducted under Robert's Rules of Order.

The ICSS is steered by an executive committee consisting of a President, an Executive Vice-President, a Vice-President Internal, and a Vice-President Finance. The remainder of council is made up of directors responsible for council's operations (social activities, athletics, marketing, etc.), as well as student representatives representing various constituencies including first year students, non-residence students, and the graduating class. The direction and priorities of council are steered by the executive committee however each individual portfolio (social, athletics, etc.) has relative autonomy to make their own decisions when planning events and activities.

The office of the Innis College Student Society is located inside Room 107 of the Innis College main building at 2 Sussex Avenue.

Innis Residence

The Innis Residence was built in 1994 and is a modern apartment-style building with seven stories, located across the street from the College at 111 St. George Street.  The building consists of four floors that form a U-shape around a courtyard, and two 3-story towers above them, on the north and south sides of the building.  The building is suite-style - each suite contains a common kitchen, common living room, two shared bathrooms and 4-5 bedrooms.  There are 327 spaces available for students in the building, which roughly consist of 60% first-year students and 40% upper-years. A number of spaces are also reserved for students from the Faculty of Applied Science and Engineering.

The residence consists of six social communities known as houses. The houses are First House (named because it is located on the first floor of the building), Devonshire West House (named after the street that backs the residence to the east), Taddle Creek House (named after a creek that flows through Toronto), Vladimir House (named after the original Innis residence building), North House (named because it is located in the building's north tower), and Ajax House (named after a University of Toronto's former satellite campus in Ajax). These social communities hold inter-residence competitions to build unity and add to the student experience. Each house is overseen by Residence Dons. The residence also hires an Assistant Dean of Residence Life and a front desk staff that offers 24-hour security to the building. The residence is also home to a student-run Innis Residence Council (IRC).

The Innis Residence was the first university residence in North America to be wired for Internet access. The current Dean of Students is Steve Masse.

Notable alumni

 Alan Bernstein - founding president, CIHR & Executive Director, Global HIV Vaccine Enterprise
 Jessi Cruickshank - Canadian television personality
 Sabrina Cruz - Canadian YouTuber
 Ron Mann - president, Sphinx Productions; filmmaker
 Stephanie Savage - executive producer and creator, Gossip Girl
 Linda Schuyler - executive producer and creator, Degrassi franchise
 Jay Bahadur - journalist and author Jeffrey Ian Ross - criminologist, University of Baltimore
 Alan Whitten - Superior Court Judge, Ontario High Court
 Sarah Gadon- actress, winner of best supporting actress in a Canadian film by Vancouver Film Critics Circle, Cosmopolis(film)
 Kate Raynes-Goldie (BA hons 2004) award-winning internet scholar, game designer and industry evangelist
 Chris Glover - Member of Provincial Parliament for Spadina-Fort York
 Jean Yoon, actress Kim's Convenience (BA 1989)

Notable faculty
 Peter H. Russell – Canadian constitutional scholar, helped write the South African Constitution.
 Joe Medjuck – film producer
 Josef Škvorecký - writer

References

Further reading
 Martin L. Friedland The University of Toronto: A History (Toronto: University of Toronto Press © 2002)
 Robin Harris A History of University of Toronto (Toronto: University of Toronto Press © 1970)
 Rick Helmes-Hayes Forty Years, 1963-2003: A History of the Department of Sociology, University of Toronto (Toronto: Canadian Scholars' Press, 2003, 215 pp.)
 Professor Brian McKillop, Matters of Mind: The University in Ontario, 1791-1951  (Ottawa: University of Ottawa Press ©1951)
 Marian Packham 100 Years of Biochemistry at the University of Toronto: An Illustrated History 1908-2008 (Toronto: University of Toronto Press © 2008)

External links

 Innis College Official Site
 Innis College Registrar's Office
 Prospective and Newly Admitted Innis College Students
 Innis College Residence Official Site
 Innis College Student Life Site
Innis College Library
 Innis Town Hall
 Cinema Studies Institute
Innis College Student Society

Educational institutions established in 1964
1964 establishments in Ontario
Colleges of the University of Toronto
Harold Innis